Friedlanderia phaeochorda is a moth in the family Crambidae. It was described by Turner in 1911. It is found in Australia, where it has been recorded from Western Australia and the Northern Territory.

References

Haimbachiini
Moths described in 1911